Soyagaon or soegaon is a Town and Taluka in Nashik District in the Indian state of Maharashtra.

Demographics
In the 2001 India census, Soyagaon had a population of 21,819. Males constituted 52% of the population and females 48%. Soyagaon had an average literacy rate of 81%, higher than the national average of 59.5%: male literacy was 85%, and female literacy was 76%. In 2001 in Soyagaon, 12% of the population was under 6 years of age.

References

Cities and towns in Nashik district